Below is a list of archaeological sites in the state of Veracruz, Mexico.

El Tajín
La Conchita
Santa Luisa
El Manatí
San Lorenzo Tenochtitlán
Macayal
Pánuco
Laguna de los Cerros
Arroyo Sonso
Los Soldados
Sayula
Medias Aguas
Estero Rabón
Cruz del Milagro
La Merced
Las Limas
Los Mangos
Arroyo Pesquero
El Viejón
La Yerbabuena
Chinameca
Cerro de Las Mesas
Loma del Zapote
Estatuilla de Los Tuxtlas
Tres Zapotes
Alvarado
Patarata Island
Nopiloa
El Zapotal
Dicha Tuerta
Remojadas
Tlalixcoyan
Los Cerros
Jaina
Matacapan
Las Higueras
Aparicio
Xicalango-Potonchán-Jonuta
Misantla
Tlapacoyan
Tlacolula
Papantla
Cempoala
Isla de Sacrificios
Palma Sola
Vega de Alatorre
Acayucan
Villa Rica
Quiahuiztlán
Tabuco
Tumilco
Isla del Idolo
El Aguila-Zacamixtle
Organos
Tepetzintla
Yahualinca
Mesa de Cacahuatenco

Relevant sites in nearby states

Tabasco
La Venta
Bari
Jonuta
Comalcalco
Ahualulcos

Puebla
Zacatlán
Metlaltoyuca
Xicotepec
Cantona

Tamaulipas
Las Flores

Others
Izapa, Chiapas
Kaminaljuyu, Guatemala
Cotzulmahuapa, Guatemala
Chalchuapa, El Salvador

References

Sandstrom, Alan R., and Enrique Hugo García Valencia. 2005. Native peoples of the Gulf Coast of Mexico. Tucson: University of Arizona Press.